Baloskion australe, commonly known as the southern or mountain cordrush, is a species of perennial herb found in southeastern Australia.

References

australe
Flora of New South Wales
Flora of Tasmania
Flora of Victoria (Australia)
Taxa named by Robert Brown (botanist, born 1773)